Stocksia may refer to:
 Stocksia (flatworm), a genus of flatworms in the family Lytocestidae
 Stocksia (plant), a genus of plants in the family Sapindaceae